Lottery (Persian: لاتاری) is a 2018 Iranian romance thriller drama film directed by Mohammad Hossein Mahdavian and written by Ebrahim Amini and Mohammad Hossein Mahdavian. The film screened for the first time at the 36th Fajr Film Festival.

Plot 
Amir Ali and Nooshin are two youngsters who are in love and want to get marry with each other while their families are in disagree with them. They both have only one dream, to win in the Lottery and get the green card and go living in USA.

Cast 
 Saed Soheili as Amir Ali
 Hadi Hejazifar as Mousa
 Hamid Farrokhnezhad as Morteza
 Ziba Karamali as Nooshin
 Javad Ezzati as Nima
 Nader Soleimani as Naeem
 Alireza Ostadi as Reza Beigi
 Mahdi Zaminpardaz as Sami
 Behzad Foroutan as Saman
 Hamidreza Hedayati as Amir Ali's Father
 Mahsa Bagheri as Nasrin
 Amirhoessin Hashemi as Sasan
 Gholamreza Shahbazi as The Prosecutor

Reception

Accolades

References

External links 
 

Films about revenge
Iranian drama films
2010s Persian-language films